János Bencze (12 October 1934 – 31 July 2014) was a Hungarian basketball player. He competed in the men's tournament at the 1960 Summer Olympics and the 1964 Summer Olympics.

References

External links
 

1934 births
2014 deaths
Hungarian men's basketball players
Olympic basketball players of Hungary
Basketball players at the 1960 Summer Olympics
Basketball players at the 1964 Summer Olympics
People from Hódmezővásárhely
Sportspeople from Csongrád-Csanád County